Webster Wagner (October 2, 1817 – January 13, 1882) was an American inventor, manufacturer and politician from New York.

Life
Wagner was born near Palatine Bridge, New York. He developed a wagon-making business with his brother James. The business had folded by 1842, largely due to the Panic of 1837. After serving as an employee for the New York Central Railroad, Wagner invented the sleeping car and luxurious parlor car.  He also perfected a system of ventilating railroad cars. His inventions were first used on the NY Central and later spread to other lines. He founded the Wagner Palace Car Company, located in Buffalo, New York. Several legal battles with the Pullman Company failed to put him and his partners out of business.

He was married to Susan Davis, and they had five children.

He was a Republican member of the New York State Assembly (Montgomery Co.) in 1871; and of the New York State Senate from 1872 until his death, sitting in the 95th, 96th, 97th, 98th, 99th, 100th, 101st, 102nd (all eight 15th D.), 103rd, 104th and 105th New York State Legislatures (all three 18th D.). He was killed in a rail accident while returning from Albany to New York City when two trains of the New York Central and Hudson River Railroad collided in between the Kingsbridge and Spuyten Duyvil stations in The Bronx, two weeks into his sixth Senate term, on January 13, 1882.

The Webster Wagner House at Palatine Bridge was added to the National Register of Historic Places in 1973.

See also 
 Rail Car Grand Isle: A preserved Wagner Palace car

Notes

References

External links 
  Webster Palace Car Company
Accident at Spuyten Duyvil
 
 Finding Aid to Webster Wagner Wagon-making Papers, 1837-1842 at the New York State Library, accessed January 5, 2016

1817 births
1882 deaths
Republican Party New York (state) state senators
Republican Party members of the New York State Assembly
Politicians from Buffalo, New York
American people in rail transportation
American railway entrepreneurs
Railway accident deaths in the United States
Accidental deaths in New York (state)
People from Palatine Bridge, New York
19th-century American politicians
Businesspeople from Buffalo, New York
19th-century American businesspeople